Fadeyeva is a rural locality (a village) in Oshibskoye Rural Settlement, Kudymkarsky District, Perm Krai, Russia. The population was 21 as of 2010.

Geography 
Fadeyeva is located 31 km north of Kudymkar (the district's administrative centre) by road. Baranova is the nearest rural locality.

References 

Rural localities in Kudymkarsky District